Tåstrup or Taastrup may refer to:
Taastrup - western suburb of København
Tåstrup (Feldballe Parish), a hamlet and a houseowners' association in Feldballe Parish
Tåstrup (Harlev Parish), a hamlet and a houseowners' association in Harlev Parish
Tåstrup (Hellested Parish), a hamlet and a houseowners' association in Hellested Parish
Tåstrup (Hyllinge Parish), a hamlet and a houseowners' association in Hyllinge Parish
Tåstrup (Jystrup Parish), a hamlet and a houseowners' association in Jystrup Parish
Tåstrup (Keldby Parish), a hamlet and a houseowners' association in Keldby Parish
Tåstrup (Lille Lyngby Parish), a hamlet in Lille Lyngby Parish
Tåstrup (Lunde Parish), a hamlet and a houseowners' association in Lunde Parish
Tåstrup (Tveje Merløse Parish), a hamlet and a houseowners' association n Tveje Merløse Parish
Tåstrup (Ødum Parish), a hamlet and a houseowners' association in Ødum Parish

See also
 Nørre Tåstrup, en bebyggelse i Horbelev Parish
 Tostrup Castle, a castle in Ingelsted Herred, Skåne
 Tastrup